Dichomeris pectinella is a moth in the family Gelechiidae. It was described by William Trowbridge Merrifield Forbes in 1931. It is found in Puerto Rico.

References

Moths described in 1931
Taxa named by Edward Meyrick
pectinella